Hydrogen cyanide, sometimes called prussic acid, is a chemical compound with the formula HCN and structure . HCN is produced on an industrial scale and is a highly valued precursor to many chemical compounds ranging from polymers to pharmaceuticals. Large-scale applications are for the production of potassium cyanide and adiponitrile, used in mining and plastics, respectively. It is more toxic than solid cyanide compounds due to its volatile nature.

Structure and general properties
Hydrogen cyanide is a linear molecule, with a triple bond between carbon and nitrogen. The tautomer of HCN is HNC, hydrogen isocyanide.

Hydrogen cyanide is weakly acidic with a pKa of 9.2. It partially ionizes in water solution to give the cyanide anion, CN−. A solution of hydrogen cyanide in water, represented as HCN, is called hydrocyanic acid. The salts of the cyanide anion are known as cyanides.

HCN has a faint bitter almond–like odor that some people are unable to detect owing to a recessive genetic trait. The volatile compound has been used as inhalation rodenticide and human poison, as well as for killing whales. Cyanide ions interfere with iron-containing respiratory enzymes.

Chemical properties
Hydrogen cyanide will react with alkenes under catalysis of nickel complexes. This reaction is called hydrocyanation.
RCH=CH2 + HCN →‎ RCH2-CH2-CN

Four molecules of HCN will tetramerize into diaminomaleonitrile, which can be converted to various purines.

History of discovery

Hydrogen cyanide was first isolated from a blue pigment (Prussian blue) which had been known since 1706, but whose structure was unknown. It is now known to be a coordination polymer with a complex structure and an empirical formula of hydrated ferric ferrocyanide. In 1752, the French chemist Pierre Macquer made the important step of showing that Prussian blue could be converted to an iron oxide plus a volatile component and that these could be used to reconstitute it. The new component was what is now known as hydrogen cyanide. Following Macquer's lead, it was first prepared from Prussian blue by the Swedish chemist Carl Wilhelm Scheele in 1782, and was eventually given the German name Blausäure (lit. "Blue acid") because of its acidic nature in water and its derivation from Prussian blue. In English, it became known popularly as prussic acid.

In 1787, the French chemist Claude Louis Berthollet showed that prussic acid did not contain oxygen, an important contribution to acid theory, which had hitherto postulated that acids must contain oxygen (hence the name of oxygen itself, which is derived from Greek elements that mean "acid-former" and are likewise calqued into German as Sauerstoff). In 1811, Joseph Louis Gay-Lussac prepared pure, liquified hydrogen cyanide. In 1815, Gay-Lussac deduced Prussic acid's chemical formula. The radical cyanide in hydrogen cyanide was given its name from cyan, not only an English word for a shade of blue but the Greek word for blue, again owing to its derivation from Prussian blue.

Production and synthesis
Hydrogen cyanide forms in at least limited amounts from many combinations of hydrogen, carbon, and ammonia. Hydrogen cyanide is currently produced in great quantities by several processes, as well as being a recovered waste product from the manufacture of acrylonitrile. In 2006, between 500 million and 1 billion pounds (between 230,000 and 450,000 t) were produced in the US.

2 CH4 + 2 NH3 + 3 O2 → 2 HCN + 6 H2O
The energy needed for the reaction is provided by the partial oxidation of methane and ammonia.

Of lesser importance is the Degussa process (BMA process) in which no oxygen is added and the energy must be transferred indirectly through the reactor wall:
CH4 + NH3 → HCN + 3H2
This reaction is akin to steam reforming, the reaction of methane and water to give carbon monoxide and hydrogen.

In the Shawinigan Process, hydrocarbons, e.g. propane, are reacted with ammonia.

In the laboratory, small amounts of HCN are produced by the addition of acids to cyanide salts of alkali metals:
H+ + NaCN → HCN + Na+
This reaction is sometimes the basis of accidental poisonings because the acid converts a nonvolatile cyanide salt into the gaseous HCN.

Historical methods of production
The large demand for cyanides for mining operations in the 1890s was met by George Thomas Beilby, who patented a method to produce hydrogen cyanide by passing ammonia over glowing coal in 1892. This method was used until Hamilton Castner in 1894 developed a synthesis starting from coal, ammonia, and sodium yielding sodium cyanide, which reacts with acid to form gaseous HCN.

Applications
HCN is the precursor to sodium cyanide and potassium cyanide, which are used mainly in gold and silver mining and for the electroplating of those metals. Via the intermediacy of cyanohydrins, a variety of useful organic compounds are prepared from HCN including the monomer methyl methacrylate, from acetone, the amino acid methionine, via the Strecker synthesis, and the chelating agents EDTA and NTA. Via the hydrocyanation process, HCN is added to butadiene to give adiponitrile, a precursor to Nylon-6,6.

HCN is used globally as a fumigant against many species of pest insect that infest food production facilities. Both its efficacy and method of application lead to very small amounts of the fumigant being used compared to other toxic substances used for the same purpose. Using HCN as a fumigant also has minimal environmental impact, compared to similar structural fumigant molecules such as sulfuryl fluoride, and methyl bromide.

Occurrence
HCN is obtainable from fruits that have a pit, such as cherries, apricots, apples, and bitter almonds, from which almond oil and flavoring are made. Many of these pits contain small amounts of cyanohydrins such as mandelonitrile and amygdalin, which slowly release hydrogen cyanide. One hundred grams of crushed apple seeds can yield about 70 mg of HCN. So-called "bitter" roots of the cassava plant may contain up to 1 gram of HCN per kilogram. Some millipedes, such as Harpaphe haydeniana, Desmoxytes purpurosea, and Apheloria release hydrogen cyanide as a defense mechanism, as do certain insects, such as burnet moths and the larvae of Paropsisterna eucalyptus. Hydrogen cyanide is contained in the exhaust of vehicles, and in smoke from burning nitrogen-containing plastics.

HCN on Titan 
HCN has been measured in Titan's atmosphere by four instruments on the Cassini space probe, one instrument on Voyager, and one instrument on Earth. HCN initially forms in Titan's atmosphere through the reaction of photochemically produced methane and nitrogen radicals which proceed through the H2CN intermediate, e.g., (CH3 + N → H2CN + H → HCN + H2). Ultraviolet radiation breaks HCN up into CN + H; however, CN is efficiently recycled back into HCN via the reaction CN + CH4 → HCN + CH3.

HCN on the young Earth 
It has been postulated that carbon from a cascade of asteroids (known as the Late Heavy Bombardment), resulting from interaction of Jupiter and Saturn, blasted the surface of young Earth and reacted with nitrogen in Earth's atmosphere to form HCN.

HCN in mammals 
Some authors have shown that neurons can produce hydrogen cyanide upon activation of their opioid receptors by endogenous or exogenous opioids. They have also shown that neuronal production of HCN activates NMDA receptors and plays a role in signal transduction between neuronal cells (neurotransmission). Moreover, increased endogenous neuronal HCN production under opioids was seemingly needed for adequate opioid analgesia, as analgesic action of opioids was attenuated by HCN scavengers. They considered endogenous HCN to be a neuromodulator.

It has also been shown that, while stimulating muscarinic cholinergic receptors in cultured pheochromocytoma cells increases HCN production, in a living organism (in vivo) muscarinic cholinergic stimulation actually decreases HCN production.

Leukocytes generate HCN during phagocytosis, and can kill bacteria, fungi, and other pathogens by generating several different toxic chemicals, one of which is hydrogen cyanide.

The vasodilatation caused by sodium nitroprusside has been shown to be mediated not only by NO generation, but also by endogenous cyanide generation, which adds not only toxicity, but also some additional antihypertensive efficacy compared to nitroglycerine and other non-cyanogenic nitrates which do not cause blood cyanide levels to rise.

HCN is a constituent of tobacco smoke.

HCN and the origin of life
Hydrogen cyanide has been discussed as a precursor to amino acids and nucleic acids, and is proposed to have played a part in the origin of life. Although the relationship of these chemical reactions to the origin of life theory remains speculative, studies in this area have led to discoveries of new pathways to organic compounds derived from the condensation of HCN (e.g. Adenine).

HCN in space

HCN has been detected in the interstellar medium and in the atmospheres of carbon stars. Since then, extensive studies have probed formation and destruction pathways of HCN in various environments and examined its use as a tracer for a variety of astronomical species and processes. HCN can be observed from ground-based telescopes through a number of atmospheric windows. The J=1→0, J=3→2, J= 4→3, and J=10→9 pure rotational transitions have all been observed.

HCN is formed in interstellar clouds through one of two major pathways: via a neutral-neutral reaction (CH2 + N → HCN + H) and via dissociative recombination (HCNH+ + e− → HCN + H). The dissociative recombination pathway is dominant by 30%; however, the HCNH+ must be in its linear form. Dissociative recombination with its structural isomer, H2NC+, exclusively produces hydrogen isocyanide (HNC).

HCN is destroyed in interstellar clouds through a number of mechanisms depending on the location in the cloud. In photon-dominated regions (PDRs), photodissociation dominates, producing CN (HCN + ν → CN + H). At further depths, photodissociation by cosmic rays dominate, producing CN (HCN + cr → CN + H). In the dark core, two competing mechanisms destroy it, forming HCN+ and HCNH+ (HCN + H+ → HCN+ + H; HCN + HCO+ → HCNH+ + CO). The reaction with HCO+ dominates by a factor of ~3.5. HCN has been used to analyze a variety of species and processes in the interstellar medium. It has been suggested as a tracer for dense molecular gas and as a tracer of stellar inflow in high-mass star-forming regions. Further, the HNC/HCN ratio has been shown to be an excellent method for distinguishing between PDRs and X-ray-dominated regions (XDRs).

On 11 August 2014, astronomers released studies, using the Atacama Large Millimeter/Submillimeter Array (ALMA) for the first time, that detailed the distribution of HCN, HNC, H2CO, and dust inside the comae of comets C/2012 F6 (Lemmon) and C/2012 S1 (ISON).

In February 2016, it was announced that traces of hydrogen cyanide were found in the atmosphere of the hot Super-Earth 55 Cancri e with NASA's Hubble Space Telescope.

As a poison and chemical weapon

In World War I, hydrogen cyanide was used by the French from 1916 as a chemical weapon against the Central Powers, and by the United States and Italy in 1918. It was not found to be effective enough due to weather conditions. The gas is lighter than air and rapidly disperses up into the atmosphere. Rapid dilution made its use in the field impractical. In contrast, denser agents such as phosgene or chlorine tended to remain at ground level and sank into the trenches of the Western Front's battlefields. Compared to such agents, hydrogen cyanide had to be present in higher concentrations in order to be fatal.

A hydrogen cyanide concentration of 100–200 ppm in breathing air will kill a human within 10 to 60 minutes. A hydrogen cyanide concentration of 2000 ppm (about 2380 mg/m3) will kill a human in about one minute. The toxic effect is caused by the action of the cyanide ion, which halts cellular respiration. It acts as a non-competitive inhibitor for an enzyme in mitochondria called cytochrome c oxidase. As such, hydrogen cyanide is commonly listed among chemical weapons as a blood agent.

The Chemical Weapons Convention lists it under Schedule 3 as a potential weapon which has large-scale industrial uses. Signatory countries must declare manufacturing plants that produce more than 30 metric tons per year, and allow inspection by the Organisation for the Prohibition of Chemical Weapons.

Hydrogen cyanide was also used in the camps for delousing clothing in attempts to eradicate diseases carried by lice and other parasites. One of the original Czech producers continued making Zyklon B under the trademark "Uragan D2" until around 2015.

During World War II, the US considered using it, along with cyanogen chloride, as part of Operation Downfall, the planned invasion of Japan, but President Harry Truman decided against it, instead using the atomic bombs developed by the secret Manhattan Project.

Hydrogen cyanide was also the agent employed in judicial execution in some U.S. states, where it was produced during the execution by the action of sulfuric acid on sodium or potassium cyanide.

Under the name prussic acid, HCN has been used as a killing agent in whaling harpoons, although it proved quite dangerous to the crew deploying it, and it was quickly abandoned. From the middle of the 18th century it was used in a number of poisoning murders and suicides.

Hydrogen cyanide gas in air is explosive at concentrations above 5.6%. This concentration is far above a toxic level.

References

External links
Institut national de recherche et de sécurité (1997). "Cyanure d'hydrogène et solutions aqueuses". Fiche toxicologique n° 4, Paris:INRS, 5pp. (PDF file, in French)
International Chemical Safety Card 0492
Hydrogen cyanide and cyanides (CICAD 61)
National Pollutant Inventory: Cyanide compounds fact sheet
NIOSH Pocket Guide to Chemical Hazards
Department of health review
Density of Hydrogen Cyanide gas

Blood agents
Cyanides
Fumigants
Hydrogen compounds
Inorganic compounds
Gaseous signaling molecules
Soviet chemical weapons program
Triatomic molecules